The following outline is provided as an overview of and topical guide to economics:

Economics – analyzes the production, distribution, and consumption of goods and services. It aims to explain how economies work and how economic agents interact.

Description of economics 
Economics can be described as all of the following:

 Academic discipline – body of knowledge given to, or received by, a disciple (student); a branch or sphere of knowledge, or field of study, that an individual has chosen to specialize in.
 Field of science  – widely recognized category of specialized expertise within science, and typically embodies its own terminology and nomenclature.  Such a field will usually be represented by one or more scientific journals, where peer-reviewed research is published.  There are many economics-related scientific journals.
 Social science  – field of academic scholarship that explores aspects of human society.

Branches of economics 
 Macroeconomics – branch of economics dealing with the performance, structure, behavior, and decision-making of an economy as a whole, rather than individual markets.
 Microeconomics – branch of economics that studies the behavior of individuals and firms in making decisions regarding the allocation of limited resources.
 Mesoeconomics In-between

Subdisciplines of economics
 Agricultural economics
 Attention economics
 Behavioral economics
 Classical economics
 Comparative economic systems
 Contract theory
 Cultural economics
 Demographic economics
 Development economics
 Ecological economics
 Econometrics
 Economic anthropology
 Economic development
 Economic geography
 Economic history
 Economic sociology
 Economics of marriage
 Education economics
 Energy economics
 Engineering economics
 Entrepreneurial economics
 Environmental economics
 Family economics
 Feminist economics
 Financial economics
 Georgism
 Green economics
 Health economics
 Industrial organization
 Information economics
 International economics
 Institutional economics
 Labor economics
 Law and economics
 Managerial economics
 Mathematical economics
 Monetary economics
 Public finance
 Public economics
 Real estate economics
 Regional economics
 Regional science
 Resource economics
 Rural economics
 Socialist economics
 Urban economics
 Welfare economics

Methodologies or approaches

 Behavioural economics
 Classical economics
 Computational economics
 Econometrics
 Evolutionary economics
 Experimental economics
 Praxeology (used by the Austrian School)
 Social psychology

Multidisciplinary fields involving economics

 Bioeconomics
 Constitutional economics
 Econophysics
 Institutionalist political economy
 Neuroeconomics
 Political economy
 Socioeconomics
 Thermoeconomics
 Transport economics

Types of economies

Economy – system of human activities related to the production, distribution, exchange, and consumption of goods and services of a country or other area.

Economies, by political & social ideological structure 

 Economic ideology
 Capitalist economy
 Planned economy
 Consumer economy (consumerism)
 Corporate economy
 Fascist economy
 Laissez-faire
 Mercantilism
 Natural economy
 Primitive communism
 Social market economy
 Socialist economy

Economies, by scope 

 Anglo-Saxon economy
 American School
 Hunter-gatherer economy
 Information economy
 New industrial economy
 Palace economy
 Plantation economy
 Token economy
 Traditional economy
 Transition economy
 World economy

Economies, by regulation 

 Closed economy
 Dual economy
 Gift economy
 Informal economy
 Market economy
 Mixed economy
 Open economy
 Participatory economy
 Planned economy
 Subsistence economy
 Underground economy
 Virtual economy

Economic elements

Economic activities 

 Business
 Business cycle
 Collective action
 Commerce
 Competition
 Consumption
 Distribution
 Employment
 Entrepreneurship
 Export
 Finance
 Government spending
 Import
 Investment
 Mergers and acquisitions
 Pricing
 Geographical pricing
 Production
 Trade
 Balance of trade
 Fair trade
 Free trade
 International trade
 Safe trade
 Tax, tariff and trade
 Terms of trade
 Trade bloc
 Trade pact
 Trader Ethic

Economic forces 

 Aggregate demand
 Aggregate supply
 Deflation
 Economic activity (see above)
 Economies of agglomeration
 Economies of scale
 Economies of scope
 Incentive
 Inflation
 Hyperinflation
 Invisible hand
 Preference
 Profit motive

Economic problems 

 Depression
 Financial crisis
 Hyperinflation
 Poverty
 Recession
 List of recessions
 Stagflation
 Unemployment

Trends and influences 

 Decentralization
 Globalization
 Industrialisation
 Internationalization

Economic measures 

 Consumer price index
 Economic indicator
 Human Development Index
 Measures of national income and output
 Gross domestic product
 Natural gross domestic product
 Gross national product
 National income
 Net national income
 Poverty level
 Standard of living
 UN Human Development Index
 Value
 Cost-of-production theory of value
 Labor theory of value
 Surplus value
 Time value of money
 Value added
 Value of Earth
 Value of life
 Measuring well-being
 Working time

Economic participants 

 Employer
 Employee
 Entrepreneur
 Central bank
 Reproductive labor

Economic politics 

 Antitrust
 Cartel
 Government-granted monopoly
 Reaganomics
 Taxation
 Income tax
 Land value tax
 Sales tax
 Tariff
 Tax, tariff and trade
 Value-added tax

Economic policy 
Economic policy
 Agricultural policy
 Fiscal policy
 Incomes policy
 Price controls
 Price ceiling
 Rent control
 Price floor
 Minimum wage
 Industrial policy
 Infrastructure-based development
 Investment policy
 Monetary policy
 Disinflation
 Inflation targeting
 Monetary hawk and dove
 Monetary reform
 Quantitative easing
 Reflation
 Policy mix – combination of a country's monetary policy and fiscal policy. These two channels influence growth and employment, and are generally determined by the central bank and the government (e.g., the United States Congress) respectively.
 Stabilization policy
 Tax policy

Infrastructure 

Infrastructure

Markets 

Market

Types of markets 
 Black market
 Commodity markets
 Financial market
 Bond market
 Money market
 Spot market
 Secondary market
 Third market
 Fourth market
 Stock market
 Free market
 Labor market
 Mass market
 Media market
 Regulated market

Aspects of markets 
 Market failure
 Market power
 Market share
 Market structure
 Market system
 Market transparency
 Market trend
 Market dominance

Market forms 

Market form
 Perfect competition, in which the market consists of a very large number of firms producing a homogeneous product.
 Monopolistic competition, also called competitive market, where there are a large number of  independent firms which have a very small proportion of the market share.
 Monopoly, where there is only one provider of a product or service.
 Monopsony, when there is only one buyer in a market.
 Natural monopoly, a monopoly in which economies of scale cause efficiency to increase continuously with the size of the firm.
 Oligopoly, in which a market is dominated by a small number of firms which own more than 40% of the market share.
 Oligopsony, a market dominated by many sellers and a few buyers.

Market-oriented activities 
 Market analysis
 Marketing
 Market segmentation
 Market intelligence
 Market research

Money 

Money
 Currency
 Community currency
 Dollar
 Local currency
 Petrocurrency
 Reserve currency
 Time-based currency
 Yen
 United States dollar
 Monetary reform
 Monetary system
 Money supply

Resources

Resource management 

Resource management
 Natural resource management
 Resource allocation

Factors of production 
Factors of production

Land 
Land
 Natural resources

Labor 
 Division of labour

Capital 

Capital
 Capital asset
 Capital intensity
 Financial capital
 Human capital
 Individual capital
 Natural capital
 Social capital
 Wealth

Economic theory 

 Consumer theory
 Efficiency wage hypothesis
 Efficient market hypothesis
 Marginalism
 Prospect theory
 Public choice theory
 Rational choice theory

Economic ideologies 
 Consumerism
 Monetarism
 Productivism
 Utilitarianism

History of economics

History of economic thought 
History of economic thought
 Ancient economic thought
 Aristotle
 Nicomachean Ethics
 Economics of the Age of Enlightenment
 Mercantilism
 British Enlightenment
 John Locke
 Dudley North
 David Hume
 French Enlightenment: Physiocracy
 François Quesnay
 Tableau économique
 Anne Robert Jacques Turgot
 Reflections on the Formation and Distribution of Wealth
 Classical economics, political economy
 Adam Smith
 The Wealth of Nations
 David Ricardo
 Socialist economics
 Marxian economics
 Labour theory of value
 Anarchist economics
 Austrian School of Economics
 Carl Menger
 Friedrich von Hayek
 Ludwig von Mises
 Neoclassical economics
 Léon Walras
 John Bates Clark
 Alfred Marshall
 Keynesian economics
 John Maynard Keynes
 Cambridge capital controversy
 Neo-Keynesian economics
 Paul Samuelson
 John Hicks (economist)
 Neoclassical synthesis
 Post-Keynesian economics
 Hyman Minsky
 Joan Robinson
 Michał Kalecki
 New Keynesian economics
 Chicago school of economics
 Milton Friedman
 Monetarism

Economic history
Economic history
 Economic events
 Economic history of the world
 Economics in the Middle Ages: feudalism and manorialism
 Economics of the Renaissance: mercantilism
 Industrial Revolution
 Economic history of World War I
 Nixon shock
 Economic history by region
 Economic history of Africa
 Economic history of Morocco
 Economic history of Nigeria
 Economic history of Somalia
 Economic history of South Africa
 Economic history of Zimbabwe
 Economic history of the Arab world
 Economic history of Asia
 Economic history of Cambodia
 Economic history of China
 Economic history of China before 1912
 Economic history of China (1912–1949)
 Economic history of China (1949–present)
 Economic history of the Republic of China
 Economic history of India
 Economic history of Indonesia
 Economic history of Iran
 Economic history of Japan
 Economic history of Malaysia
 Economic history of Pakistan
 Economic history of Taiwan
 Economic history of Turkey
 Economic history of the Ottoman Empire
 Economic history of Vietnam
 Economic history of the Philippines
 Economic history of Australia
 Economic history of Europe
 Economic history of France
 Economic history of Germany
 Economic history of the German reunification
 Economic history of Greece and the Greek world
 Economic history of Iceland
 Economic history of Ireland
 Economic history of Italy
 Economic history of Portugal
 Economic history of Scotland
 Economic history of Spain
 Economic history of Sweden
 Economic history of Venice
 Economic history of the Netherlands (1500–1815)
 Economic history of the Republic of Ireland
 Economic history of the Russian Federation
 Economic history of the United Kingdom
 Economic history of North America
 Economic history of Canada
 Economic history of Mexico
 Economic history of the United States
 Economic history of Central America
 Economic history of Nicaragua
 Economic history of South America
 Economic history of Argentina
 Economic history of Brazil
 Economic history of Chile
 Economic history of Colombia
 Economic history of Ecuador
 Economic history of Peru
 Economic history by subject
 History of banking
 History of money
 History of stock markets

General economic concepts
 Ricardian economics
 Keynesian economics
 Classical economics
 Neo-Keynesian economics
 Neoclassical economics
 New classical economics
 New Keynesian economics
 Participatory economics
 Home economics
 Goods
 Complement good
 Coordination good
 Free goods
 Inferior goods
 Normal goods
 Public good
 Substitute good
 isms
 Capitalism
 Natural Capitalism
 Economic subjectivism
 Socialism
 Modern portfolio theory
 Game theory
 Human development theory
 Production theory basics
 Time preference theory of interest
 Agent
 Arbitrage
 Big Mac Index
 Big push model
 Cash crop
 Canadian and American economies compared
 Catch-up effect
 Chicago school
 Collusion
 Commodity
 Comparative advantage
 Competitive advantage
 complementarity
 Consumer and producer surplus
 Cost
 Cost-benefit analysis
 Cost-of-living index
 Debt
 Devaluation
 Disposable income
 Economic
 Economic data
 Economic efficiency
 Economic growth
 Economic globalization
 Economic profits
 Economic modeling
 Economic reports
 Economic system
 Ecosystem services
 Elasticity
 Environmental finance
 Euro
 Event study
 Experience economy
 Externality
 Factor price equalization
 Federal Reserve
 Financial instruments
 Fiscal neutrality
 Full-reserve banking
 General equilibrium
 Gold standard
 Import substitution
 Income
 Income elasticity of demand
 Income velocity of money
 Induced demand
 Industrial organization
 Input-output model
 Interest
 Keynes, John Maynard
 Knowledge-based economy
 Laissez-faire
 Land
 Living wage
 Local purchasing
 Lorenz curve
 Marginal Revolution
 Means of production
 Mental accounting
 Menu costs
 Missing market
 Model - economics
 Model - macroeconomics
 Monopoly profit
 Moral hazard
 Moral purchasing
 Multiplier (economics)
 Neo-classical growth model
 Network effect
 Network externality
 Operations research
 Opportunity cost
 Output
 Parable of the broken window
 Pareto efficiency
 Price
 Price discrimination
 Price elasticity of demand
 Price points
 Outline of industrial organization
 Production function
 Productivity
 Profit (economics)
 Profit maximization
 Public bad
 Public debt
 Purchasing power parity
 Rahn curve
 Rate of return pricing
 Rational expectations
 Rational pricing
 Real business cycle
 Real versus nominal in economics
 Regression analysis
 Returns to scale
 Risk premium
 Saving
 Scarcity
 Seven-generation sustainability
 Slavery
 Social cost
 Social credit
 Social welfare
 Stock exchange
 Subsidy
 Subsistence agriculture
 Sunk cost
 Supply and demand
 Supply-side economics
 Sustainable competitive advantage
 Sustainable development
 Sweatshop
 Technostructure
 The Theory of Moral Sentiments by Adam Smith
 Transaction cost
 Triple bottom line
 Trust
 Utility
 Utility maximization problem
 Uneconomic growth
 U.S. public debt
 Virtuous circle and vicious circle
 Wage rate
 X-efficiency
 Yield
 Zero sum game

Economics organizations 
 American Economic Association
 American Institute for Economic Research
 American Law and Economics Association
 Association for Comparative Economic Studies
 Association for Evolutionary Economics
 Association for Social Economics
 Canadian Economics Association
 Centre for Economic Policy Research
 China Center for Economic Research
 Eastern Economic Association
 Econometric Society
 European Economic Association
 International Association for Feminist Economics
 International Economic Association
 Latin American and Caribbean Economic Association
 National Association for Business Economics
 National Bureau of Economic Research
 Royal Economic Society
 Southern Economic Association
 Western Economic Association International

Economics publications 

 List of economics journals
 List of important publications in economics

Persons influential in the field of economics 

 List of economists

Nobel Memorial Prize–winning economic historians 
 Milton Friedman won the Nobel Memorial Prize in Economic Sciences in 1976 for "his achievements in the fields of consumption analysis, monetary history and theory and for his demonstration of the complexity of stabilization policy".
 Robert Fogel and Douglass North won the Nobel Memorial Prize in 1993 for "having renewed research in economic history by applying economic theory and quantitative methods in order to explain economic and institutional change".
 Merton Miller, who started his academic career teaching economic history at the LSE, won the Nobel Memorial Prize in 1990 with Harry Markowitz and William F. Sharpe.

Other notable economic historians

 Moses Abramovitz
 T. S. Ashton
 Roger E. Backhouse
 Correlli Barnett
 Jörg Baten
 Maxine Berg
 Ben Bernanke
 Fernand Braudel
 Rondo Cameron
 Sydney Checkland
 Carlo M. Cipolla
 Gregory Clark
 Thomas C. Cochran
 Nicholas Crafts
 Louis Cullen
 Peter Davies
 Brad DeLong
 Barry Eichengreen
 Stanley Engerman
 Charles Feinstein
 Niall Ferguson
 Ronald Findlay
 Roderick Floud
 Claudia Goldin
 John Habakkuk
 Earl J. Hamilton
 Eli Heckscher
 Eric Hobsbawm
 Leo Huberman
 Thomas M. Humphrey
 Harold James
 Ibn Khaldun
 Charles P. Kindleberger
 John Komlos
 Emmanuel Le Roy Ladurie
 David Laidler
 David Landes
 Tim Leunig
 Friedrich List
 Robert Sabatino Lopez
 Angus Maddison
 Karl Marx
 Peter Mathias
 Ellen McArthur
 Deirdre McCloskey
 Joel Mokyr
 Cormac Ó Gráda
 Henri Pirenne
 Karl Polanyi
 Erik S. Reinert
 Christina Romer
 W. W. Rostow
 Murray Rothbard
 Larry Schweikart
 Ram Sharan Sharma
 Adam Smith
 Anna Jacobson Schwartz
 Robert Skidelsky
 Graeme Snooks
 R. H. Tawney
 Peter Temin
 Richard Timberlake
 Adam Tooze
 Eberhard Wächtler
 Jeffrey Williamson
 Tony Wrigley

See also
 Index of accounting articles
 Index of economics articles
 Index of international trade topics
 JEL classification codes
 List of business theorists
 List of economic communities
 List of economics films
 List of economics awards
 List of free trade agreements
 Outline of business management
 Outline of commercial law
 Outline of community
 Outline of finance
 Outline of marketing
 Outline of production

External links 

 History of Economic Thought and Critical Perspectives (NSSR)
 The Joy of Economics, chapter 1 of Surfing Economics by Huw Dixon

Outline
 

 
 
Economics